The Trophées du Sunside, broadcast on Radio France, established in 2001 by Stéphane Portet, director of Sunset/Sunside, in partnership with the SACEM, is one of the most important competition for new musicians on the jazz scene in Europe. It is awarded each year to a young talent. 

A jury composed of famous jazz musicians vote to determine a winner, there are different prizes, but one that defines the winner of the year is the prize of the group, the group leader is awarded the first prize of "Trophées du Sunside".

Rewards are contracts with international jazz festivals, recording on a label, promotion in specialized media (Jazzman, TSF, France Musique, etc.).

List of Laureates 

 2001 : Alex Terrier
 2002 : Yaron Herman
 2003 : Leila Olivesi
 2004 : Max Pinto
 2005 : Karim Gherbi
 2006 : Boris Pokora
 2007 : Scott Tixier
 2008 : Alexandre Herer

Jazz festivals in France
Jazz awards
Awards established in 2001